The 2021 Bowling Green Falcons football team represented Bowling Green State University during the 2021 NCAA Division I FBS football season. The Falcons were led by third-year head coach Scot Loeffler and played their home games at Doyt Perry Stadium in Bowling Green, Ohio. They competed as members of the East Division of the Mid-American Conference (MAC).

Previous season
In a season initially canceled and then reinstated with a limited schedule due to the ongoing COVID-19 pandemic, the Falcons finished the 2020 season 0–5 in a conference-only schedule to finish in last place in the East Division.

Schedule

References

Bowling Green
Bowling Green Falcons football seasons
Bowling Green Falcons football